The 2022 Duquesne Dukes football team represented Duquesne University as a member of the Northeast Conference (NEC) during the 2022 NCAA Division I FCS football season. The Dukes, led by 18th-year head coach Jerry Schmitt, played their home games at Arthur J. Rooney Athletic Field.

Previous season

The Dukes finished the 2021 season with a record of 7–3, 5–2 NEC play to finish in a tie for second place.

Schedule

Game summaries

at Florida State

at Youngstown State

Thomas More

at Hawaii

at Stonehill

Merrimack

at Central Connecticut

LIU

Sacred Heart

at Saint Francis (PA)

Wagner

References

Duquesne
Duquesne Dukes football seasons
Duquesne Dukes football